The Longs in Ireland got their names from a number of different origins. Some are of English, Scottish and Norman descent. The Norman de Long and le Lung arrived in the 11th century with the Anglo-Norman conquest in 1066 AD and established in numerous locations. A number of Irish Gaelic septs of O'Longain and O'Longaig contributed to the origin of the name. One sept was located in County Armagh, but the greater numbers were in County Cork at Cannovee and also at Moviddy. The Longs lost all their lands in the upheavals of the 17th century. The name is found in its greatest numbers in Munster, County Cork being most favored. The line of direct descent from the last elected chieftain to the present day is unbroken — the official title is styled "O'Long of Carrenelongy". The Irish origin also comes from "Lonklin" from county Tipperary and Dublin.

A more uncommon origin of the name originates from Scandinavia, More specifically, Sweden. The names Långbäck and Langbekk arrived in the 13th century in Sweden near the border of Norway. Not to be confused with the town Långbäck Långbäck did originate there. Around the Swedish emigration to the United States the name was anglicised from Långbäck to Longback, Long and Longbrook.

For the specific American political dynasty, see Long family.

For the specific English political dynasty, see :Category:Long family of Wiltshire.

For an exhaustive list of people with the surname, see below:

Disambiguation of common given names with this surname
Arthur Long (disambiguation), multiple people
Ben Long (disambiguation), multiple people
Bill Long (disambiguation), multiple people
Bob Long (disambiguation), multiple people
Carl Long (disambiguation), multiple people
Charles Long (disambiguation), multiple people
Chris Long (disambiguation), multiple people
Christopher Long (disambiguation), multiple people
David Long (disambiguation), multiple people
Doc Long (disambiguation), multiple people
Earl Long (disambiguation), multiple people
Ed Long (disambiguation), multiple people
Eddie Long (disambiguation), multiple people
Edward Long (disambiguation), multiple people
George Long (disambiguation), multiple people
Greg Long (disambiguation), multiple people
Harold Long (disambiguation), multiple people
Harry Long (disambiguation), multiple people
Henry Long (disambiguation), multiple people
Howard Long (disambiguation), multiple people
Huey Long (disambiguation), multiple people
Hugh Long (disambiguation), multiple people
Jake Long (disambiguation), multiple people
Jeff Long (disambiguation), multiple people
James Long (disambiguation), multiple people
Joe Long (disambiguation), multiple people
John Long (disambiguation), multiple people
Joseph Long (disambiguation), multiple people
Justin Long (disambiguation), multiple people
Kevin Long (disambiguation), multiple people
Larry Long (disambiguation), multiple people
Matthew Long (disambiguation), multiple people
Max Long (disambiguation), multiple people
Michael Long (disambiguation), multiple people
Naomi Long (disambiguation), multiple people
Pamela Long (disambiguation), multiple people
Richard Long (disambiguation), multiple people
Robert Long (disambiguation), multiple people
Stephen Long (disambiguation), multiple people
Steven Long (disambiguation), multiple people
Susan Long (disambiguation), multiple people
Ted Long (disambiguation), multiple people
Terry Long (disambiguation), multiple people
Thomas Long (disambiguation), multiple people
Theodore Long (disambiguation), multiple people
Tom Long (disambiguation), multiple people
Walter Long (disambiguation), multiple people
William Long (disambiguation), multiple people

Arts and literature
Bernard Long, British illustrator
Catharine Long (1797–1867), English novelist
Edwin Long (1829–1891), English painter
Frank Belknap Long (1901–1994), American science fiction writer
Leonard Long (1911-2013), Australian painter
Ruth Frances Long (born 1971), Irish author
Sydney Long (1871–1955), Australian painter

Entertainment
Avon Long (1910–1984), American Broadway actor and singer
Audrey Long (1922–2014), American actress
Brad Long (actor), American actor
Charlotte Long (1965–1984), English actress, youngest daughter of the 4th Viscount Long
Dorian Long, character in the American sitcom Moesha, played by Ray J
Janice Long (1955–2021), BBC radio presenter, sister of Keith Chegwin
Jodi Long (born 1954), American actress of Asian descent
John Long (blues musician) (born 1950), American country blues musician
Jonathon "Boogie" Long, American blues rock singer, guitarist, and songwriter
Josie Long (born 1982), English comedian
Justin Long (born 1978), American actor
Loretta Long (born 1938), American actress
Matt Long (born 1980), American actor
Nia Long (born 1970), American actress
Norman Long (1893–1951), English comic entertainer
Pam Long (born 1953), American actress and writer
P.W. Long, American musician
Rob Long (born 1965), American screenwriter
Ronald Long (1911–1986), English actor
Shorty Long (1940–1969), American soul singer
Shelley Long (born 1949), American actress
Tim Long (born 1969), Canadian comedy writer

History and military
Anne Long (c.1681–1711), English celebrated beauty and London society figure
Armistead L. Long (1825–1891), American Civil War general
Beeston Long (1757–1820), English businessman
Catherine Tylney-Long (1789–1825), English heiress
Eli Long (1837–1903), American Civil War general
Jane Herbert Wilkinson Long (1798–1880), Texas pioneer
Pierse Long (1739–1789), American merchant, soldier and politician

Politics
Armwell Long (1754-1834), American politician and military officer
Benjamin Long (1838–1877), Swiss-born American politician, mayor of Dallas, Texas
Beth Long (born 1948), American politician from Missouri
Betty Jane Long (born 1928), Mississippi state representative
Billy Long (born 1955), U.S. Representative from Missouri
Blanche Long (1920–1998), first lady of Louisiana
Breckinridge Long (1881–1958), American diplomat
Catherine Small Long (1924–2019), former U.S. Representative from Louisiana
Chester Deming Long (1819–1884), Wisconsin politician
Chester I. Long (1860–1934), U.S. Representative from Kansas
Clarence Long (1908–1994), U.S. Representative from Maryland
Dick Long (1924–2021), Australian politician
Dudley Long (1748–1829), English Whig politician
Francis R. Long (1812–1818), eleventh mayor of Kansas City
Gene Long (born 1957), Canadian former Member of the Newfoundland and Labrador House of Assembly
Gerald Long (born 1944), American politician
Gifford Long (c. 1576–1635), English MP and magistrate
Gillis William Long (1923–1985), U.S. Representative from Louisiana
Huey Pierce Long Jr. (1893-1935), U.S. Senator (D-LA) and Governor (D-LA)
Jacob Elmer Long, American politician
Janet C. Long (born 1944), Florida politician
Jefferson F. Long (1836–1901), U.S. Representative from Georgia
Jill Long Thompson (born 1952), former U.S. Representative from Indiana
Jimmy D. Long (1931–2016), American politician
J. C. Long (born 1959), Kansas politician
Lislebone Long (1613–1659), British politician and Speaker in the House of Commons
Logan Long (1878–1933), American politician
Marshall Long (1936–2018), American businessman and politician
Naomi Long MLA (born 1971), Northern Ireland politician 
Olivier Long (1915–2003), Swiss ambassador
Oren E. Long (1889–1965), tenth Governor General of Hawaii and inaugural U.S. Senator from Hawaii
Rose McConnell Long (1892-1970), American politician; wife of Huey Pierce Long Jr.
Russell B. Long (1918–2003), American politician, son of Huey and Rose McConnell Long
Speedy Long (1928–2006), U.S. Representative from Louisiana
Verne Long (1925-2022), American politician and farmer
Virginia Long (born 1942), American counsel and former justice
Willis K. Long (born 1930), American politician

Science and academic
Adrian Long (1941–2022), civil engineer from Northern Ireland
Crawford Long (1815–1878), American surgeon and pharmacist, first to use ether as an anaesthetic
Cyril Norman Hugh Long (1901–1970), English-American biochemist
Hilario Fernández Long (1918–2002), Argentine structural engineer
J. Scott Long, American professor of sociology and statistics
Lois Long (mycologist),  (1918–2005) American scientist, illustrator
Norton E. Long (1910–1993), American author and professor at Virginia Polytechnic Institute
Roger Long (1680–1770), English astronomer
Scott Long (born 1963), American human rights activist

Sports
Asa Long (1904–1999), American checker champion
Barry Long (ice hockey) (born 1949), Canadian former ice hockey player
Cameron Long (born 1988), American basketball player in the Israeli Premier League
Charlie Long (1938–1989), American football player
Dale Long (1926–1991), American baseball player
Emory Long (1911–1976), American baseball player
Fred Long (1896–1977), Australian rules footballer
Fred T. Long (1896–1966), American baseball player and college football coach
Frederick Long (cricketer) (1815–1903), English clergyman and cricketer
Geoff Long (c. 1930–?), Australian rules footballer
Grant Long (born 1966), American former basketball player
Herman Long (1866–1909), American baseball player
Howie Long (born 1960), American football Hall of Fame player
Hunter Long (born 1998), American football player
Khari Long (born 1982), American and Canadian football player
Leo Long, American former javelin thrower
Maxie Long (1878–1959), American athlete
Luz Long (1913–1943), German Olympic long-jumper
Philip Long (swimmer) (born 1948), American swimmer
Phillip Long (born 1983), American soccer player
Rien Long (born 1981), former American football player
Ryan Long (born 1973), American baseball player
Sam Long (baseball) (born 1995), American baseball player
Sean Long (born 1974), English rugby player
Sean Long (footballer) (born 1995), Irish footballer
Shane Long (born 1987), Irish footballer
Shawn Long (born 1993), American basketball player
Shed Long Jr. (born 1995), American baseball player
Stacy Long (born 1985), English footballer
Stuart Long (19632014), American boxer-turned-Catholic priest; inspiration for the 2022 film Father Stu
Terrence Long (born 1971), American baseball player
Thelma Coyne Long (1918–2015), Australian tennis player
Tim Long (American football) (born 1963), American football player

Miscellaneous
Barry Long (1926–2003), Australian spiritualist
Brad Long, Canadian celebrity chef
Clarence Hailey Long (1910–1978), Texas rancher, famous as original Marlboro Man
Gregory Long (born 1946), eighth president and CEO of the New York Botanical Garden
Lazarus Long, fictional character of the science-fiction writer Robert A. Heinlein
Reub Long (1898–1974), Oregon rancher and author
Zelma Long, American enologist and winemaker
Jinafire Long, fictional daughter of a Chinese Dragon from Monster High

See also
Laing (surname)
Lang (surname)
Lange (surname)

English-language surnames
Surnames from nicknames